Eleven to Fly is the third studio album by English electronic music duo Tin Tin Out. It was released on 15 November 1999 by Virgin Records and VC Recordings.

Singles
The album includes four singles which reached the top 40 of the UK Singles Chart: a cover of The Sundays' "Here's Where the Story Ends", featuring vocals by Shelley Nelson, peaked at number seven in early 1998, "Sometimes", also featuring Nelson on vocals, reached number 20 in the same year (on the album as an acoustic version), the title track "Eleven to Fly", with vocals by Wendy Page, reached number 26 a year later in 1999, and a cover of Edie Brickell & New Bohemians' "What I Am", featuring Emma Bunton from the Spice Girls, reached number two towards the end of 1999.

Track listing

Charts

References

1999 albums
Virgin Records albums